Hîrtopul Mare is a commune in Criuleni District, Moldova. It is composed of two villages, Hîrtopul Mare and Hîrtopul Mic.

References

Communes of Criuleni District